Dorothy Bush may refer to:

 Dorothy Bush Koch (born 1959), American author and philanthropist
 Dorothy Vredenburgh Bush (1916–1991), American political activist
 Dorothy Walker Bush (1901–1992), wife of Prescott Sheldon Bush